Skeleton at the 2018 Winter Olympics was held at the Alpensia Sliding Centre near Pyeongchang, South Korea. The events were scheduled to take place between 15 and 17 February 2018. A total of two skeleton events were held, one each for men and women.

Qualification

A total of 50 quota spots were available to athletes to compete at the games. A maximum 30 men and 20 women could qualify. The qualification was based on 3 successive iterations of the world rankings of 14 January 2018.

Competition schedule
The following was the competition schedule for the two skeleton events.

All times are (UTC+9).

Medal summary

Medal table

Events

Participating nations
A total of 50 athletes from 24 nations (including the IOC's designation of Olympic Athletes from Russia) participated. Eight nations made their Winter Olympics debut in the sport: Belgium, China, Ghana, Jamaica, Netherlands, Israel, Nigeria and Ukraine.

References

External links
Official Results Book – Skeleton

 
2018
Skeleton
Winter Olympics
Skeleton competitions in South Korea